Maruthamunai is a coastal village located along the eastern coastline, about 358 kilometres away from the capital city, Colombo. The Village has an estimated population of 13,948, predominantly Muslims. Maruthamunai Located in Kalmunai, Ampara District in the Eastern Province of Sri Lanka.

December 2004 tsunami

Maruthamunai was one of the villages most severely affected in Sri Lanka by the Indian Ocean tsunami on 26 December 2004. 
The disaster killed 922 residents of the village, displaced 11,086, 1,391 houses were completely destroyed and 1,359 were partially damaged.  Previous to the disaster the population of the village was officially 17,393. In addition to over 1,300 homes, many public buildings were destroyed by the tsunami.

History 

The primitive history of Maruthamunai village is entirely different from the history of the Muslim villages in the South - East region of Sri Lanka. The ancestral Muslims of Maruthamunai had settled in Thuraineelavanai village in the Southern boundary of the Batticaloa District, some 6oo years ago. After a lapse of few years of living there, those Muslims mutually replaced the Tamils lived in Maruthamunai.

Maruthamunai is bounded on the North by Periyaneelavanai village, on the West by paddy fields together with the river bed of the Batticaloa Lagoon, on the South by another conventional village - Pandiruppu, and on the East by the Bay of Bengal of the Indian Ocean. Maruthamunai had an extent area of 2.11 square kilometers and a Muslim population of about twenty thousand in 2004. This number is believed to have been decreased into 4/5 portion due to the Indian Ocean tsunami on 2004.12.26 on Sunday.

During the period from 661 A.D. to 750 A.D., there had been a dictatorial rule by “Umaiyahs” in the Arabian sub-continent where the rule was not accepted by the family members of “Hashim” of the Prophet Mohamed (Sal) and this contradiction created constant enmity between two aristocrats. Meanwhile, when a Umaiyan ruler, Abdul Malik Bin Marwan ascended the throne in 685 A.D., he used to vehemently tortured the “Hashim” members. Being unable to withstand the unbearable cruelty, many Arabian Muslims arrived in countries like Jawa, Malaya, and other far east countries.

Quite a number of such Muslims came to Puttalam and Kalpitiya villages of the North - West coast of Sri Lanka and lived there ever since. There are the Muslims who permanently settled in Sri Lanka. In the latter period of 15th century, some Muslims were deported by the Europeans who governed the coastal regions of Sri Lanka. These Muslims, finally, sought asylum from the Sinhalese king known as “Senarath” who ruled the rest of Sri Lanka making Kandy, as the city. Thus, those Muslims were colonized in the South East region of Sri Lanka. The ancient lineage of these Muslims became the Muslims of Maruthamunai village, in particular.

Another group of the Muslims, sailing through the Batticaloa Lagoon, settled in a South East bounded village, Thuraineelavanai making conducive existence with a group of Tamils lived there.

In the late nineteenth century, some people of India called “Seerpalha caste” settled down on their own in the rest of Thuraineelavanai, and so were they in Maruthamunai as well. It is natural to give a name to a new place where migrants wish to live in. Therefore, it is crystal clear that the people of a “Seerpalha caste” had named our village as “Maruthamunai”.
The Muslims settled in Thuraineelavanai had been well- killed in Weaving, whereas the people of “Seerpalha caste” were interested in Agriculture. The two physical environments in their respective villages were adverse to their occupations. This situations paved the way for mutual transfer of the people so that the two villages could inductively engage in their occupations.

Hence the Muslims, who on mutual transfer settled in Maruthamunai village, were headed by the citizens of Jawa, called Aboobucker Ali and his relative; Sermon Mohamed Haji. They made their housings at “Aathi Medu” and “Santhi Manal” areas where the people of “Seerpalha caste” once lived at and also they built a small mosque at “Awakkali yappa palli” on or around 1527, the very spot where the present “Masjithun Noor” mosque is situated and used to follow Islamic doctrines right there onwards.

This ancient Mosque, having been destroyed in 1912, was given new shape into a beautiful mosque of Islamic architectural features in 1926. Considering the dense population existed, this pretty Mosque again was reconstructed commencing on 1977.04.08 in the name of “Masjithun Noor” and counstruction work continue till date.This is the majestic mosque located at Batticaloa, Main Street at Maruthamunai.

This Mosque is administered by 22 trustees selected from 60 Marikkayars representing 07 kudis (Tribes/Totems).the name of the kudis are as follows.
1.Yahuwak Kudi (யாஹூவாக் குடி)
2.Sermon Haji Kudi (சேர்மன் ஹாஜி குடி)
3.Vadakkana Kudi(வடக்கனா குடி)
4.Sammanotti Kudi(சம்மாநோட்டி குடி)
5.Manthara Kudi(மாந்தறா குடி)
6.Veth'tha Singha Aaraichy Kudi(வெத்தசிங்க ஆராச்சி குடி)
7.Moothanachi Kudi(மூத்தநாச்சி குடி)

A group of Muslims in Maruthamunai North moved to live in Maruthamunai in 1862 and made a small cadjan built Mosque called southern mosque. This too was extended then and there as population grew up. In 1957, reconstruction work began aiming at constructing the mosque permanently, and ended in 1976 bearing its name “Masjithul kabeer”. These two mosques served as the Jummah mosque from there Islamic preaching had been taking place every week on Fridays. Also these mosques have contributed this much in the fields of religious, cultural, educational and peace oriented activities related to the welfare of the people of Maruthamunai. Then emerged another Jummah Mosque at Akbar Village in the North East of Maruthamunai. This Mosque has been totally damaged by the tsunami disaster on 26th 12. 2004.

Instead, however, Jummah sermons take place at Bakiyathus Salihath Mosque, next to Akbar Mosque from 1.5.2005 onwards. And so came another Jumma Mosque called “Masjidul Malharul Magbooliya” in the South East part of Maruthamunai from 2003.10.24 onwards.

Since the people of Maruthamunai had their wedlock most probably within the boundaries of Maruthamunai; this village was thickly populated round the year. Taking this grave problem into consideration, a village of 100 houses named “Akbar Village Housing scheme”, “S. Z. M. Mashoor Moulana Housing Scheme” and “25 house scheme” were established in 1980s. The state lands for these schemes were exploited by the Government in the extreme coastal belt area.

GS divisions and population (2022) 

Source: http://www.kalmunai.ds.gov.lk

Schools 
 Al Manar Central College(N.S)
 Al Minan Vidyalaya
 Akbar Vidyalaya
 Pulavermani Sharifdeen Vidyalaya
 Shams Central College (N.S)
 Al Madeena Vidyalaya
 Al-Hambra

References 

 
Villages in Ampara District